Ivan Magalhães Miguel Cardoso (born 13 November 2003) is a Portuguese professional footballer player who plays as a goalkeeper for F.C. Porto B.

Professional career
Cardoso made his professional debut with F.C. Porto B in a 1-1 Liga Portugal 2 tie with Benfica B on 25 January 2021.

References

External links
 
 
 

2003 births
Living people
Footballers from Porto
Portuguese footballers
Portugal youth international footballers
Association football goalkeepers
FC Porto B players
Liga Portugal 2 players